The Mixed 8x100m relay competition at the 2014 Youth Olympic Games was held on 26 August 2014 in Nanjing Olympic Sports Center. The competitors were divided in 67 teams composed of mixed athletes from different NOCs, gender and disciplines aiming to be balanced in strength. In the preparation phase there are ten athletes (five men and five women) in competition phases there are 8 athletes (four men and four women).

Each team was composed of:
 Three athletes from Group A events (100m, 200m, 400m, 100/110m hurdles, 400m hurdles)
 Two athletes from Group B (800m, 1500m, 3000m, 2000m steeplechase, Race Walk)
 One athlete from Group C (High Jump, Pole Vault, Long Jump and Triple Jump)
 One athlete from Group D (Shot Put, Discus Throw, Hammer Throw and Javelin Throw)
 Three athletes at random from all remaining athletes

Schedule

Results

Heats
Only the first 9 teams by time progress to the Final.

Final

External links
 iaaf.org - Mixed 8x100m relay
 Nanjing 2014 - Athletics Official Results Book
 

Athletics at the 2014 Summer Youth Olympics